Akira Tachibana may refer to:

Akira Tachibana, a character in the manga series After the Rain
Akira Tachibana (Symphogear), a character in the anime series Symphogear